Kuressaare linnastaadion is a multi-purpose stadium in Kuressaare, Estonia. It is currently used mostly for football matches and hosts the matches of FC Kuressaare. The stadiums seated capacity is 2,000.

The stadium was renovated in 2014 and a new grandstand is planned to be constructed by 2026.

Kuressaare linnastaadion has also hosted six official Estonian national football team matches, with the last one taking place in 2008.

Estonia national team matches

Gallery

References

External links

 Kuressaare linnastaadion
 World Stadiums

Football venues in Estonia
Kuressaare
Sport in Kuressaare
Multi-purpose stadiums in Estonia
Buildings and structures in Saaremaa
Athletics (track and field) venues in Estonia